Swami Shraddhanand (22 February 1856 – 23 December 1926), also known as Mahatma Munshi Ram Vij, was an Arya Samaj sannyasi and an Indian Independence activist who propagated the teachings of Dayananda Saraswati. This included the establishment of educational institutions, like the Gurukul Kangri University, and played a key role on the Sangathan (consolidation and organization) and the Shuddhi (purification), a Hindu reform movement in the 1920s.

Early life and education

He was born on 22 February 1856 in the village of Talwan in the Jalandhar District of the Punjab Province of India. He was the youngest child in the family of Lala Nanak Chand, who was a Police Inspector in the United Provinces (now Uttar Pradesh), then administered by the East India Company. His given name was Brihaspati Vij, but later he was called Munshi Ram Vij by his father, a name that stayed with him till he took sanyas in 1917, variously as Lala Munshi Ram Vij and Mahatma Munshi Ram.

He adopted atheism after a few incidents, such as when he was prevented from entering the temple while a noble woman was praying. He also was witness to a "compromising" situation involving a church's father with a nun, the attempted rape of a young devotee by pontiffs of the Krishna cult, and the suspicious death of a little girl at the home of a Muslim lawyer. All of these events cemented his atheism. He eventually passed mukhtari exams and began studying to become a lawyer.

Meeting Dayanand
He first met Dayanand Saraswati when Dayanand visited Bareilly to give lectures. His father was handling arrangements and security at the events, due to the attendance of some prominent personalities and British officers. Munshiram attend the lectures at his father's request. He originally went with the intent of spoiling the arrangements, then claimed to be strongly influenced by Dayanand's courage, skill, and strong personality. After completing his studies Munshiram started his practice as lawyer.

Career

Schools
In 1892 Arya Samaj was split into two factions after a controversy over whether to make Vedic education the core curriculum at the DAV College Lahore. He left the organization and formed the Punjab Arya Samaj. The Arya Samaj was divided between the Gurukul Section and the DAV Section. Shraddhanand headed for Gurukuls.  In 1897, when Lala Lekh Ram was assassinated, Shraddhanand succeeded him. He headed the 'Punjab Arya Pratinidhi Sabha', and started its monthly journal, Arya Musafir. In 1902 he established a Gurukul in Kangri, India near Haridwar. This school is now recognized as Gurukul Kangri University.

In 1917, Mahatma Munshi Ram took sanyas as "Swami Shradhanand Saraswati".

Shraddhanand established gurukul Indraprashtha in Aravali near Faridabad, Haryana.

Activism
In 1917, Shraddhanand left Gurukul to become an active member of the Hindu reform movements and the Indian Independence movement. He began working with the Congress, which he invited to hold its session at Amritsar in 1919. This was because of the Jalianwala massacre, and no one in the Congress Committee agreed to have a session at Amritsar. Shraddhanand presided over the session.

He also joined the nationwide protest against the Rowlatt Act. The same year he protested in front of a posse of Gurkha soldiers at the Clock Tower in Chandni Chowk, then was allowed to proceed. In the early 1920s he emerged as an important force in the Hindu Sangathan (consolidation) movement, which was a by product of the now revitalised Hindu Maha Sabha.

He wrote on religious issues in both Hindi and Urdu. He published newspapers in the two languages as well. He promoted Hindi in the Devanagri script, helped the poor and promoted the education of women. By 1923, he left the social arena and plunged whole-heartedly into his earlier work of the shuddhi movement (re-conversion to Hinduism), which he turned into an important force within Hinduism. In 1922,Dr Ambedkar called Shraddhanand “the greatest and most sincere champion of the Untouchables”.

In late 1923, he became the president of Bhartiya Hindu Shuddhi Sabha, created with an aim of reconverting Muslims, specifically  'Malkana Rajputs' in the western United Province. This brought him into direct confrontation with Muslim clerics and leaders of the time. 1,63,000 Malkana Rajputs were converted back to Hindu fold due to this movement.

Social Emancipation Movement of Dalits (Untouchables) 
Swami Shraddhanand was one of the tallest leaders of the Hindu Sanghatan movement who came from the Arya Samaj stream. When Swami Shraddhanand had to resen from the committee meant for 'Harijan' welfare in the Congress, Babasaheb Ambedkar called him 'the greatest and sincerest champion' of Scheduled Communities. He was also the first person to use the term 'Dalit'. He strongly propagated Hindu Sanghatan (Hindu Unity). He stated that 'mere birth had no standing in determining the position a man was to hold in the society'.

Assassination

To protect Hindu society from the onslaught of Christianity and Islam's forced conversions, the Arya Samaj represented by him, started the 'Shuddhi' ( purification) movement to reconvert to the Hindu fold the converts of Christianity and Islam. This led to increasing communalisation of social life during the 1920s and later snowballed into communal political consciousness. Consequently, on 23 December 1926 he was assassinated by Abdul Rashid. Swami Shraddhanand’s Shuddhi mission of reconverting Malkana Rajputs, did not go down well with late Mahatma Gandhi. In the 1922 issue of his magazine, Young India, he is reported to have criticised Swami Shraddhanand in an article, titled ‘Hindu-Muslim-Tensions: Causes and Resistance’.

Gandhi wrote:

As a tribute to the man who was martyred for the Hindu cause, Savarkar’s brother Narayanrao decided to start a weekly titled Shraddhanand from Bombay, beginning 10 January 1927. Savarkar contributed several articles to this weekly under pen-names.

Today, the 'Swami Shraddhanand Kaksha' at the archeological museum of the Gurukul Kangri University in Haridwar houses a photographic journey of his life.

A statue of him was placed in front of Delhi Town Hall after independence, replacing a statue of Queen Victoria. This location in Old Delhi is termed ghantaghar because the old clock tower stood here until the 1950s.

Personal life
Shraddhanand and his wife Shiva Devi had two sons and two daughters. His wife died when Shraddhanand was only 36 years old. His granddaughter Satyavati was a prominent opponent of the British rule in India.

See also

 Arya Samajis
 Hindu reformists

Bibliography
 The Arya Samaj and Its Detractors: A Vindication, Rama Deva. Published by s.n, 1910.
 Hindu Sangathan: Saviour of the Dying Race, Published by s.n., 1924.
 Inside Congress, by Swami Shraddhanand, Compiled by Purushottama Rāmacandra Lele. Published by Phoenix Publications, 1946.
 Kalyan Marg Ke Pathik (Autobiography:Hindi), New Delhi. n.d.
 Autobiography (English Translation), Edited by M. R. Jambunathan. Published by Bharatiya Vidya Bhavan, 1961

Further reading

 Swami Shraddhanand, by Satyadev Vidyalankar, ed. by Indra Vidyavachaspati. Delhi, 1933.
 Swami Shraddhanand (Lala Munshi Ram), by Aryapathik Lekh Ram. Jallandhar. 2020 Vik.
 Swami Shraddhanand, by K.N. Kapur. Arya Pratinidhi Sabha, Jallandhar, 1978.
 Swami Shraddhanand: His Life and Causes, by J. T. F. Jordens. Published by Oxford University Press, 1981.
 Section Two:Swami Shraddhanand . Modern Indian Political Thought, by Vishwanath Prasad Varma. Published by Lakshmi Narain Agarwal, 1961. Page 447.
 Chapt XI: Swami Shraddhanand. Advanced Study in the History of Modern India : 1920–1947. by G. S. Chhabra. Published by Sterling Publishers, 1971. Page 211
 Pen-portraits and Tributes by Gandhiji: '(Sketches of eminent men and women by Mahatma Gandhi)', by Gandhi, U. S. Mohan Rao. Published by National Book Trust, India, 1969. Page 133
 Swami Shraddhanand – Indian freedom fighters: struggle for independence. Anmol Publishers, 1996. .
 Telegram to Swami Shraddhanand, (2 October 1919) – Collected Works, by Gandhi. Published by Publications Division, Ministry of Information and Broadcasting, Govt. of India, 1958. v.16. Page 203.
 An article on Swami Shraddhanand in "The Legacy of The Punjab" by R M Chopra, 1997, Punjabee Bradree, Calcutta,

References

External links

Postage stamp on Swami Shraddhanand by IndianPost in 1970

1856 births
1926 deaths
1926 murders in India
People from Jalandhar
People murdered in Delhi
Indian Hindu monks
20th-century Hindu philosophers and theologians
Indian independence activists from Punjab (British India)
Arya Samajis
Hindu writers
Indian murder victims
Hindu martyrs
20th-century Indian educational theorists
20th-century Indian philosophers
19th-century Indian educational theorists
19th-century Indian philosophers
Scholars from Punjab, India